Nizhnyaya is a rural locality (a village) in Beketovskoye Rural Settlement, Vozhegodsky District, Vologda Oblast, Russia. The population was 69 as of 2002.

Geography 
Nizhnyaya is located 64 km northwest of Vozhega (the district's administrative centre) by road. Anufriyevskaya is the nearest rural locality.

References 

Rural localities in Vozhegodsky District